Sinitovo Gap (‘Prohod Sinitovo’ \'pro-hod si-'ni-to-vo\) is the ice-covered pass of elevation 1170 m extending 1.6 km in the northwest foothills of Detroit Plateau on Danco Coast in Graham Land, Antarctica. It separates Lale Buttress on the southeast from Kaliva Range on the northwest, with a branch of upper Breguet Glacier flowing northwards through the pass to join Wright Ice Piedmont.

The saddle is named after the settlement of Sinitovo in Southern Bulgaria.

Location
British mapping in 1978.

Maps
British Antarctic Territory. Scale 1:200000 topographic map. DOS 610 Series, Sheet W 64 60. Directorate of Overseas Surveys, Tolworth, UK, 1978.
 Antarctic Digital Database (ADD). Scale 1:250000 topographic map of Antarctica. Scientific Committee on Antarctic Research (SCAR). Since 1993, regularly upgraded and updated.

Notes

References
 Bulgarian Antarctic Gazetteer. Antarctic Place-names Commission. (details in Bulgarian, basic data in English)
 Sinitovo Gap. SCAR Composite Gazetteer of Antarctica

External links
 Sinitovo Gap. Copernix satellite image

Mountain passes of Graham Land
Bulgaria and the Antarctic
Danco Coast